Alexander McGregor (May 5, 1864 – October 19, 1939) was a lumber merchant and political figure in Nova Scotia, Canada. He represented Pictou in the House of Commons of Canada from 1917 to 1921 as a Unionist Party member.

He was born in McLellan's Brook, Nova Scotia, the son of Daniel McGregor and Mary Jane McGillivray, and was educated there and in New Glasgow. McGregor established himself in business in New Glasgow. In 1889, he married Sarah M. Fraser. He died in New Glasgow at the age of 75.

Electoral record

References

Members of the House of Commons of Canada from Nova Scotia
Unionist Party (Canada) MPs
1864 births
1939 deaths